Neil Michael O'Leary (born October 10, 1958) is an American politician and retired police chief currently serving as the 46th mayor of the City of Waterbury, Connecticut. He is a member of the Democratic Party.

Chief of police
In 1980, O'Leary joined the Waterbury Police Department. In 2004, he became Waterbury Chief of Police. In the summer of 2009, O'Leary left his position in Waterbury to become the chief of police of Wolcott, Connecticut.

Politics
In 2011, O'Leary stepped down as Wolcott Chief of Police to run for mayor of Waterbury.

Elections

2011
The mayoral elections were held on November 8, 2011, and O'Leary won with 45.97% of the votes, beating former mayor of Waterbury, Michael Jarjura.

2013
On November 5, 2013, O'Leary was re-elected for a second term, defeating board of education commissioner Jason Van Stone and perennial Independent Party candidate Larry De Pillo. The turnout for the election was 23%.

2015
On November 3, 2015, O'Leary was re-elected for a third term, soundly defeating all challengers. The voter turnout for the election was 21%.
As a result of a change to the city charter following the 2014 charter referendum, O'Leary became the first mayor of Waterbury to win a four-year term.

2019

References

Mayors of Waterbury, Connecticut
Connecticut Democrats
University of New Haven alumni
Living people
Northeastern University alumni
American police officers
1958 births
21st-century American politicians